Mungo Jerry is the debut album by Mungo Jerry, released in 1970. The initial British release featured lettering on the front of the sleeve and a group photo inside which appeared to be three-dimensional when viewed through a pair of 3D red and green lenses included in the packaging. It reached No. 14 in the British charts that summer. Some foreign versions include the track "In the Summertime".

Track listing
Side 1
"Baby Let's Play House" (Arthur Gunter)  – 2:32
"Johnny B. Badde" (Dorset)  – 3:00
"San Francisco Bay Blues" (Jesse Fuller)  – 3:38
"Sad Eye Joe" (King)  – 2:50
"Maggie" (Dorset)  – 4:10
"Peace in the Country" (Dorset)  – 3:05

Side 2

"See Me" (Dorset)  – 3:37
"Movin' On" (King)  – 4:14
"My Friend" (Dorset) - 2:36
"Mother *!*!*! Boogie" (Earl, Cole, King, Dorset) - 2:48
"Tramp" (King) - 5:05
"Daddies Brew" (Earl)  – 3:40

Charts

Personnel

Band

Ray Dorset – lead vocals, lead and 6 and 12-string acoustic guitars, kazoo, stomp, tambourine
Paul King – vocals, 6 and 12-string acoustic guitars, banjo, jug
Colin Earl – piano
Mike Cole – bass

Technical

Bob Scerbo - production coordinator
Dorothy Schwartz - coordinator
The Graffiteria - album design

References

External links
 

1970 debut albums
Mungo Jerry albums
Janus Records albums